The Embassy of Laos in Washington, D.C. is the  Lao People's Democratic Republic's diplomatic mission to the United States. It is located at 2222 S Street N.W. in Washington, D.C.'s Kalorama neighborhood. 

The Ambassador is Khamphan Anlavan.

The building was previously the home of United States Senator from Pennsylvania David A. Reed.

References

External links
 
Official website
wikimapia

Laos
Washington, D.C.
Laos–United States relations